The North Fork Solomon River Lattice Truss Bridge, now located on a golf course just southeast of Norton County, Kansas, was listed on the National Register of Historic Places in 2003 when at its original location on a road near Lenora, Kansas, and its registration was updated in 2008 to address its relocation.

It is a single-span -long metal lattice truss bridge fabricated by the Canton Bridge Co. 
It now crosses a tributary of Prairie Dog Creek on the Prairie Dog Golf Course, a nine-hole golf course.

When originally listed the bridge's road had little traffic and the bridge was expected to survive indefinitely.

Its listing was consistent with standards set in a study of historic metal truss bridges in Kansas.

It was moved in 2006, and its National Register registration was amended in 2008 for its proposed relocation.  Its  width and its load capacity were then deemed insufficient for traffic on its road.

It now serves golf carts and pedestrians traversing between holes #5 and #6 of the golf course, southeast of Norton in Norton County, Kansas.

References

External links

National Register of Historic Places in Norton County, Kansas
Bridges completed in 1925
Bridges on the National Register of Historic Places in Kansas
Lattice truss bridges in the United States